Rothschild Bank may refer to:

 Edmond de Rothschild Group, Swiss bank in Geneva
 N M Rothschild & Sons, British bank in London
 Mayer Amschel Rothschild, former German bank in Frankfurt am Main
 Rothschild & Cie Banque, Paris
 Rothschild & Co, French bank in Paris
 S. M. von Rothschild, former Austrian bank in Vienna
 C M de Rothschild & Figli, former Italian bank in Naples